Gregory Lawrence Graham (born November 26, 1970) is an American former professional basketball player who played five seasons in the National Basketball Association (NBA).

College career 
Graham played collegiately for Bob Knight and the Indiana University Hoosiers, where he played alongside Calbert Cheaney, Alan Henderson and Damon Bailey. From 1991 to 1993, the Hoosiers posted 87 victories, the most by any Big Ten team in a three-year span, breaking the mark of 86 set by Knight's Indiana teams of 1974–76. Teams from these three seasons spent all but two of the 53 poll weeks in the top 10, and 38 of them in the top 5. They captured two Big Ten crowns in 1990–91 and 1992–93, and during the 1991–92 season reached the Final Four. During the 1992–93 season, the 31–4 Hoosiers finished the season at the top of the AP Poll, but were defeated by Kansas in the Elite Eight.

College statistics

|-
| style="text-align:left;"| 1989–90
| style="text-align:left;"| Indiana
| 29 || 16 || 21.0 || .471 || .387 || .778 || 2.6 || 2.0 || 0.8 || 0.4 || 9.7
|-
| style="text-align:left;"| 1990–91
| style="text-align:left;"| Indiana
| 34 || 13 || 19.1 || .510 || .241 || .694 || 2.6 || 1.6 || 1.0 || 0.2 || 8.7
|-
| style="text-align:left;"| 1991–92
| style="text-align:left;"| Indiana
| 34 || 16 || 26.3 || .502 || .427 || .741 || 4.0 || 2.6 || 1.4 || 0.3 || 12.8
|-
| style="text-align:left;"| 1992–93
| style="text-align:left;"| Indiana
| 35 || 32 || 31.9 || .550 || .514 || .825 || 3.2 || 2.9 || 1.3|| 0.2 || 16.5
|- class="sortbottom"
| style="text-align:center;" colspan="2"| Career
| 132 || 77 || 24.7 || .514 || .439 || .766 || 3.1 || 2.3 || 1.1 || 0.2 || 12.0

Professional career
Selected by the Charlotte Hornets in the first round (17th pick overall) of the 1993 NBA draft, he played in five NBA seasons from 1993 to 1997 for the Philadelphia 76ers, New Jersey Nets, Seattle SuperSonics and Cleveland Cavaliers. He averaged 4.5 points per game in his NBA career

Graham returned to his alma mater, Warren Central High School, to coach for 7 seasons, resigning in April, 2015 with a record of 80–74, when 
family considerations resulted in a move to Rhode Island. 
His tenure at Warren Central included three appearances in the Marion County tournament championship.

References

 "Greg Graham resigns as Warren Central basketball coach", IndyStar, March 5, 2015

External links
NBA stats @ basketball-reference.com

1970 births
Living people
African-American basketball players
American expatriate basketball people in Sweden
American men's basketball players
Basketball players from Indianapolis
Charlotte Hornets draft picks
Cleveland Cavaliers players
Fort Wayne Fury players
Idaho Stampede (CBA) players
Indiana Hoosiers men's basketball players
M7 Borås players
McDonald's High School All-Americans
New Jersey Nets players
Parade High School All-Americans (boys' basketball)
Philadelphia 76ers players
Seattle SuperSonics players
Shooting guards
21st-century African-American sportspeople
20th-century African-American sportspeople